Sweet freedom may refer to:

Music

Albums
 Sweet Freedom (Uriah Heep album), a 1973 album
 Sweet Freedom (Michael McDonald album), a 1986 compilation album
 Sweet Freedom - Now What?, a 1994 album by Joe McPhee
 Sweet Freedom, a 1994 album by Octave

Songs
 "Sweet Freedom" (song), a 1986 song by Michael McDonald
 "Sweet Freedom", a 1968 single by The Outer Limits, later covered by Christie
 "Sweet Freedom", a 1998 single by Shawn Christopher

Other uses
 Sweet Freedom: A Devotional, a 2015 book by Sarah Palin

See also